Fernando Augusto da Silva (born 15 November 1979) is a Brazilian jiu-jitsu competitor, mixed martial arts fighter, and submission grappler. He is a black belt under professor Alexandre Paiva of Team Alliance. Tererê is a two-time World Champion in Brazilian Jiu-Jitsu (2000 and 2003) in black belt division. He has also won a number of other Brazilian jiu-jitsu competitions, including Pan-American Championship, South-American Championship, Copa do Mundo and Brazilian National Championship.

Tererê is known as one of the most influential competitors of all-time, as well as the most entertaining, because of his aggressive and highly active style.

Early years
Born in the slums of Cantagalo, Rio de Janeiro, Tererê began his fighting career by training capoeira, dealing drugs, and running away from the police. His Brazilian jiu-jitsu career began at the age of 14 when professor Otavio Couto invited him to try Brazilian jiu-jitsu at his recently opened gym in Leblon, Rio de Janeiro. Professor Couto had met Tererê and his friends parking cars at McDonald's on Rua de Amoedo, Ipanema, Rio de Janeiro. At the gym, Couto and other teachers, Alexandre Paiva and Roberto Traven, were impressed by Tererê's passion and desire to learn and began to teach him the techniques and principles of jiu-jitsu.

Competition career
The first big victory for him was when in 1994 he won the Brazilian Championship. In 1997 he won the World Championship (Mundials) as a blue belt. In 1998 Professor Couto awarded Tererê with a purple belt, who later that year won the open weight division in the Mundials.
A year later Fernando received a brown belt from professor Paiva and won the Mundials in his weight division (under 181 lbs), beating 2000 champion and future UFC lightweight champion BJ Penn in the semi-final.
Some time after the competition professor Fabio Gurgel invited Tererê to São Paulo to train with him. Before leaving, Tererê received his black belt from professor Paiva.
Next year in the Mundials Tererê won his weight class, first time as a black belt. By that time he had won the title in every belt class available. He went to win the title again in 2003.

Despite being fairly light weight (weighing around 165 lbs) Tererê competed the 2004 Championships in ultra-heavy class (over 221 lbs) finishing second, only losing to Fabrício Werdum in the final by points.

Personal life
'O Faixa Preta', a film about the life Tererê both on and off the mats premiered in 2022 and is available for streaming on HBO Max as of March 17, 2023.

Championships
World Championship (Mundials)
 1997 Blue Belt Champion
 1998 Purple Belt Champion
 1999 Brown Belt Champion
 2000 Black Belt Champion
 2003 Black Belt Champion

Copa do Mundo
 2002 Black Belt Champion
 2003 Black Belt Champion

Brazilian Nationals
 1994 Blue Belt Champion
 1996 Blue Belt Champion
 1999 Brown Belt Champion
 2001 Black Belt Champion
 2003 Black Belt Champion

Mixed martial arts record

|-
| Loss
|align=center|0-1
| Gleison Tibau
|Decision (split)
|Bitetti Combat Nordesta 2
|
|align=center|3
|align=center|5:00
|Natal, Rio Grande do Norte, Brazil
|

TT Team
Tererê and Eduardo Telles together established the TT Team in the beginning of 2003. The team was partly assembled to train and prepare future champions in the field of jiu-jitsu, but its main focus was to improve people's lives by developing a healthy lifestyle via training. Fernando and Eduardo wanted to make it possible for everyone to enjoy their life, despite their backgrounds.

TT Team met its end in 2006 due to differences between Terere and Telles.

During its short existence the TT Team produced notable fighters like Rubens 'Cobrinha' Charles and André Galvao.

Instructor Lineage  
Mitsuyo "Count Koma" Maeda → Carlos Gracie, Sr. → Helio Gracie → Rolls Gracie → Romero "Jacare" Cavalcanti → Alexandre Paiva → Fernando "Tererê" Augusto

References

 Tererê talks about his early life and career at GTR 
 Tererê's biography and info at BJJHeroes.com 
 Penn BJ (2010): Why I Fight  page 91
 CBJJ/IBJJF Tournament Results 
 fernandoterere.com at Internet Archive
 mma-record at sherdog.com
 Announcement regarding the future of Team TT at Internet Archive

External links
 Highlight Video https://www.youtube.com/watch?v=rEhuHihC6LQ

1979 births
Living people
Brazilian male mixed martial artists
Mixed martial artists utilizing capoeira
Mixed martial artists utilizing Brazilian jiu-jitsu
Brazilian practitioners of Brazilian jiu-jitsu
People awarded a black belt in Brazilian jiu-jitsu
Brazilian capoeira practitioners
Sportspeople from Rio de Janeiro (city)